James Keith Brown (born 3 October 1953) is a Scottish former footballer.

Brown attended Musselburgh Grammar School and was signed from Midlothian boys by English football club Aston Villa in May 1969 following a recommendation by scout Peter Doherty. He was Aston Villa's youngest ever player to play in a first team game at 15 years 349 days, a record which still stands to this day, playing at left-back. He signed professional in 1970. He played in 75 League matches for Villa scoring 1 goal. He also played in 12 Cup games. Brown won the FA Youth Cup with Villa in 1972 before being sold to Preston North End in October 1975.

Brown left Preston in 1978, and signed for Greek club Ethnikos. He returned to English football two years later with Portsmouth, and ended his senior career after a season with Scottish club Hibernian.

References

External links 

1953 births
Living people
Footballers from South Lanarkshire
Association football midfielders
Scottish footballers
Scottish expatriate footballers
Expatriate footballers in Greece
Aston Villa F.C. players
Preston North End F.C. players
Ethnikos Piraeus F.C. players
Portsmouth F.C. players
Hibernian F.C. players
Worcester City F.C. players
English Football League players
Scottish Football League players
People from Bothwell
People educated at Musselburgh Grammar School